Dmitri Olegovich Belousov (born 21 April 1980) is a former Russian professional football player.

Club career
He played two seasons in the Russian Football National League for FC Lada Togliatti and FC Metallurg-Kuzbass Novokuznetsk.

References

External links
 

1980 births
Footballers from Saint Petersburg
Living people
Russian footballers
Association football goalkeepers
FC Zenit-2 Saint Petersburg players
FC Lada-Tolyatti players
FC Rotor Volgograd players
FC Sokol Saratov players
FC Irtysh Omsk players
FC Novokuznetsk players
FC Sheksna Cherepovets players
FC Amur Blagoveshchensk players